Evergreen Lands is a historic home located at Rhinebeck, Dutchess County, New York. It was designed by architect John Russell Pope in the Tudor Revival style. It was built about 1932 and is a one to two story dwelling, asymmetrical, with a steeply pitched slate hipped roof.  The first story is built of fieldstone, with stucco and half-timbering above.  Also on the property are three contributing sheds and a stone wall.  The house was built for Laura Delano, a cousin of President Franklin D. Roosevelt.  It was originally intended for use as a caretaker's cottage for a larger house that was never built.

It was added to the National Register of Historic Places in 1987.

References

John Russell Pope buildings
Houses on the National Register of Historic Places in New York (state)
Tudor Revival architecture in New York (state)
Houses completed in 1932
Houses in Rhinebeck, New York
National Register of Historic Places in Dutchess County, New York